Federal Lezgian National and Cultural Autonomy is the largest public organization of Lezgians in Russia, founded in 1999 in Moscow.  It is headquartered in the capital, and the responsibilities of the organization cover the entire country.

External links 
 Official site
 ФЛНКА — общая информация
 Лезгинская автономия вступает в ООН — Газета «Настоящее время»
 Участники съезда ФЛНКА раскритиковали договор России и Азербайджана о госгранице

Ethnicity in politics
Members of the Unrepresented Nations and Peoples Organization
Political organizations based in Russia
Lezgins